Abdul-Aziz Ayaba Musah is a Ghanaian politician and member of parliament for the Mion constituency. He was elected to during the 2020 parliamentary, becoming the first MP to win on the tickets of New Patriotic Party in the Mion constituency.

Early life and education 
He was born on 1 January 1986 and hails from Sang in the Northern region of Ghana. He had his SSSCE in 2005. In 2017, he had his Post graduate certificate in Public Administration and in 2010 he further had Degree in Economics.

Career 
He was a national service personnel at the National Health Insurance Authority and later the administrator for the Local Government Service. He is the General Manager for Alhaj Musah Enterprise.

Political career 
He is a member of NPP and currently the MP for Mion Constituency. He won the seat with 21,552 votes whilst Mohammed Abdul Aziz of the NDC had 14,158 votes. The capture of the seat by Abdul Aziz made history because it was the first time the NPP won the Mion Constituency in 28 years.

In 2021, Abdul-Aziz together with Alexander Kwamena Afenyo-Markin, Johnson Kwaku Adu, Laadi Ayii Ayamba and Emmanuel Kwasi Bedzrah were sworn in during the Extraordinary Session 2021 of the Parliament of the ECOWAS which happened in Freetown in Sierra Leone.

Committees 
He is a member of the Special Budget Committee and also a member of the Employment, Social Welfare and State Enterprises Committee.

Personal life 
Abdul Aziz is a Muslim.

Philanthropy 
In 2020, he donated a motorcycle to the Chief of Jagrido in the Northern region of Ghana.

References 

1986 births
Living people
Ghanaian Muslims
Ghanaian MPs 2021–2025
New Patriotic Party politicians